Calcimitra is a genus of sea snails, marine gastropod mollusks in the family Mitridae.

Species
Species within the genus Calcimitra include:

 Calcimitra arnoldeyasi 
 Calcimitra brinkae 
 Calcimitra brunetta (Chino & Herrmann, 2015)
 Calcimitra chiangfucius (S.-I Huang & R. Salisbury, 2017)
 Calcimitra chiangfucius 
 Calcimitra christinae 
 Calcimitra glaphyria 
 Calcimitra hilli 
 Calcimitra invicta (S.-I Huang & R. Salisbury, 2017)
 Calcimitra invicta 
 Calcimitra kingtsio 
 Calcimitra labecula 
 Calcimitra lussii 
 Calcimitra marrowi 
 Calcimitra meyeriana 
 Calcimitra morchii 
 Calcimitra philippeboucheti Thach, 2020
 Calcimitra philosopha (S.-I Huang & R. Salisbury, 2017)
 Calcimitra poppei 
 Calcimitra salva 
 Calcimitra soela Marrow, 2020
 Calcimitra subflava 
 Calcimitra taiwanbale (S.-I Huang & R. Salisbury, 2017)
 Calcimitra toi S.-I Huang & Q.-Y. Chuo, 2019
 Calcimitra triplicata 
 Calcimitra verweyi 
 Calcimitra wuhuai S.-I Huang & Q.-Y. Chuo, 2019

Species brought into synonymy
 Calcimitra chuoi (S.-I Huang & R. Salisbury, 2017) : synonym of Cancillopsis chuoi (S.-I Huang & R. Salisbury, 2017)

References

 Huang S.-I. (2011) Calcimitra, a new genus of deep-water Mitridae (Gastropoda: Mitridae) with the description of five new species from Taiwan and the Philippines. Visaya 3(4): 88-97

External links
 Fedosov A., Puillandre N., Herrmann M., Kantor Yu., Oliverio M., Dgebuadze P., Modica M.V. & Bouchet P. (2018). The collapse of Mitra: molecular systematics and morphology of the Mitridae (Gastropoda: Neogastropoda). Zoological Journal of the Linnean Society. 183(2): 253-337

 
Gastropod genera